The Lancia Lambda is an innovative automobile produced from 1922 through 1931. It was the first car to feature a load-bearing unitary body, (but without a stressed roof) and it also pioneered the use of an independent suspension (the front sliding pillar with coil springs). Vincenzo Lancia even invented a shock absorber for the car and it had excellent four wheel brakes. Approximately 11,200 Lambdas were produced.

Nine versions of the Lambda were built:

 1st series, produced 1923, 400 built.
 2nd series, produced between 1923 and 1924, 1,100 built. Minor modifications for engine.
 3rd series, produced 1924, 800 built. Engine modified.
 4th series, produced between 1924 and 1925, 850 built. Modified windscreen.
 5th series, produced 1925, 1,050 built. 4-speed gearbox.
 6th series, produced between 1925 and 1926, 1,300 built. Car is sold now with bare chassis and with two wheelbases.
 7th series, produced between 1926 and 1928, 3,100 built. New bigger engine.
 8th series, produced between 1928 and 1930, 3,903 built. Again bigger engine.
 9th series, produced 1931, 500 built. Last series sold only bare chassis.

Engines
The narrow-angle aluminium Lancia V4 engine was also notable. All three displacements shared the same long  stroke, and all were SOHC designs with a single camshaft serving both banks of cylinders. The first engine had a 13°  V angle, the second 14° and the third 13° 40'.

Gallery

References

Lancia by Michael Frostick, 1976.

External links

 Lancia Motor Club (UK)
 Lancia Lambda at Simeone Automotive Museum

Lambda
Cars introduced in 1922
1930s cars
Rear-wheel-drive vehicles